Edwards v Canada (AG), also known as the Persons Case, is a Canadian constitutional case that decided in 1929 that women were eligible to sit in the Senate of Canada. The legal case was put forward by the Government of Canada on the lobbying of a group of women known as The Famous Five—Henrietta Edwards, Nellie McClung, Louise McKinney, Emily Murphy and Irene Parlby.  The case began as a reference case by the federal Cabinet directly to the Supreme Court of Canada, which ruled that women were not "qualified persons" and thus ineligible to sit in the Senate. The five women then appealed to the Judicial Committee of the Imperial Privy Council in London, at that time the court of last resort for Canada within the British Empire and Commonwealth. The Judicial Committee overturned the Supreme Court's decision.  (The case name lists Edwards as the lead appellant, as her name came first alphabtically.)

The Persons Case was a landmark case in two respects. The case established that Canadian women were eligible to be appointed senators and also established that the Canadian constitution should be interpreted in a way that was more consistent with the needs of society.

Some saw the eligibility of women for the senate as "radical change"; others saw it as a restoration of the original framing of the English constitutional documents, including the Bill of Rights 1689, which uses only the term "person", not the term "man" (or "woman" for that matter).

Some others have interpreted the Privy Council rule as causing a change in the Canadian judicial approach to the Canadian constitution, an approach that has come to be known as the living tree doctrine. This is a doctrine of constitutional interpretation that says that a constitution is organic and must be read in a broad and liberal manner so as to adapt it to changing times.

Background 
In 1916, Emily Murphy, a well-known activist for women's rights, and a group of other women attempted to attend a trial of Alberta women accused of prostitution. She and the rest of the group of women were ejected from the trial on the grounds that the testimony was "not fit for mixed company". Emily Murphy was outraged and appealed to Charles Wilson Cross, the Attorney General of Alberta, arguing, "If the evidence is not fit to be heard in mixed company, then ... the government ... [must] set up a special court presided over by women, to try other women." Much to her surprise, the minister not only agreed, but appointed her as the magistrate. On her first day on the job, however, her authority to preside as a judge was challenged by a lawyer on the basis that women were not considered to be "persons" under the British North America Act. In 1917, the Supreme Court of Alberta ruled that women were persons. 

Some time later, Emily Murphy tested the issue in the rest of Canada by allowing her name to be put forward to Prime Minister Robert Borden as a candidate for Canadian Senator. He rejected her on the grounds that women were not "persons". In response to a petition signed by nearly 500,000 Canadians that asked that she be appointed to the Senate, Borden stated that he was willing to do so, but could not on the basis of an 1876 British common law ruling that stated that "women were eligible for pains and penalties, but not rights and privileges".

Petition to the federal government 

Some years later, Emily Murphy asked four other prominent Albertan women to join her in a petition to the federal government on the issue of women's status. On August 27, 1927, the four other women (Irene Marryat Parlby, Nellie Mooney McClung, Louise Crummy McKinney, and Henrietta Muir Edwards) joined her for tea at her house. The five women, later to be known as the Famous Five (or the Valiant Five) all signed the petition, asking the federal government to refer two questions relating to women's status to the Supreme Court of Canada. The two questions were:

Reference to the Supreme Court 

In Canada, the federal government has the power to refer questions to the Supreme Court of Canada to clarify legal and constitutional issues. Ernest Lapointe, who was Minister of Justice in the government of William Lyon Mackenzie King, reviewed the petition and recommended to the federal Cabinet that the questions be narrowed down from two to one, relating to the appointment of women to the federal Senate of Canada under section 24 of the British North America Act, 1867 (now known as the Constitution Act, 1867).

On October 19, 1927, the Cabinet submitted this question for clarification to the Supreme Court of Canada:

Emily Murphy, speaking for the five petitioners, originally objected to this change in the wording of the question, which she described in a letter to the Deputy Minister of Justice as "a matter of amazement and perturbation to us". On behalf of the petitioners, she asked that the Government withdraw the single question and refer the original two questions to the Supreme Court, along with a new, third question:

After further correspondence with the Deputy Minister and consultation with their lawyer, however, Emily Murphy advised the Deputy Minister that they accepted the single question posed by the Cabinet.

Opinion of the Supreme Court of Canada 
The Supreme Court of Canada heard the case on March 14, 1928, and issued its decision on April 24, 1928. Francis Alexander Anglin, Chief Justice of Canada, wrote the majority judgment, with Lamont J. and Smith J. concurring. Mignault J. and Duff J. wrote separate concurring opinions. 

Anglin C.J.C. began by reviewing the provisions relating to the appointment of Senators under the Constitution Act, 1867. Section 23 of the Act sets out the qualifications for a Senator. Senators must be at least thirty years old, must be a British subject, must own real and personal property with a net value of at least $4,000, and must live in the Province for which they are appointed. Section 23 uses the pronoun "He" to describe these qualifications, which contributed to the argument that only men could be appointed to the Senate.

Section 24 then provides:

The question for the Court was whether women could be "qualified persons" under s. 24 and thus eligible to be appointed to the Senate. Ultimately, all five Justices held that the meaning of "qualified persons" did not include women. The Court interpreted the phrase "qualified person" based on their understanding of the intention of the drafters of the Constitution Act, 1867, despite acknowledging that the role of women in society had changed since that date. In 1867, women could not sit in Parliament. Thus, if there were to be an exception to the practice from that period, it would have to be explicitly legislated. The majority decision held that the common law incapacity of women to exercise public functions excluded women from the class of "qualified persons" under section 24 of the Constitution Act, 1867.

A common misinterpretation of the case is that the Supreme Court held that women are not persons. For example, the website of Status of Women Canada, a federal government organization, states, "After five weeks of debate and argument the Supreme Court of Canada decided that the word 'person' did not include women."

The majority judgment of the Supreme Court of Canada noted: 

The Court did not respond directly to the question as posed by the federal Cabinet. Instead, the Court gave its own interpretation of the question in a discussion of precedents regarding public office:

The Court's unanimous answer to that question was:

At that time, however, the Supreme Court was not the final arbiter of constitutional questions in Canada.

Appeal to the Judicial Committee of the Privy Council

Name of the case 
The five women then took the case on appeal to the Judicial Committee of the Privy Council, at that time the court of last resort for the British Empire. Since their names were listed on the appeal documents in alphabetical order, Henrietta Muir Edwards was listed as the first appellant, leading to the case being entered as Edwards v Canada (Attorney General). However, it is more generally known as the Persons Case, from the subject matter.

Ruling 
The landmark ruling was handed down on October 18, 1929. The Lord Chancellor, Lord Sankey, writing for the committee, found that the meaning of "qualified persons" could be read broadly to include women, reversing the decision of the Supreme Court. He wrote that "[t]he exclusion of women from all public offices is a relic of days more barbarous than ours", and that "to those who ask why the word ["person"] should include females, the obvious answer is why should it not". Finally, he wrote:

Living tree doctrine 
To arrive at his conclusion, Sankey proposed an entirely new approach to constitutional interpretation that has since become one of the core principles of constitutional law in Canada.

From this the approach became known as the living tree doctrine which requires "large and liberal" interpretation.

Aftermath 

Although the ruling was of crucial importance for Canadian women in the long term, it did not result in Emily Murphy being appointed to the Senate. It was only a year later, on February 15, 1930, however, that the first woman, Cairine Reay Wilson, was appointed to the Senate.

Nearly 80 years later, in October 2009, the Senate voted to name the Five, posthumously, Canada's first "honorary senators".

Legacy
An annual award, the Governor General's Awards in Commemoration of the Persons Case, was created in 1979 and continues to be presented to five individuals each year to honour distinguished achievements that advance the equality of girls and women in Canada.

Emily Murphy's house where the tea party occurred is now on the campus of the University of Alberta.

A statue of the Famous Five was unveiled in Calgary in 1999, and a replica placed on Parliament Hill in 2000. According to a publication of Library and Archives Canada, "The work depicts them as they might have appeared on hearing the news of the Privy Council's ruling. Standing behind an empty chair, Emily Murphy, with a triumphant gesture beckons to visitors, men and women equally, to have a place at this celebration of a new day for women in Canada."

The fifty-dollar note in the Canadian Journey Series (first issued in 2004) featured the statue of the Famous Five celebrating the result of the Persons Case.

See also
 List of Judicial Committee of the Privy Council cases
 List of Judicial Committee of the Privy Council cases originating in Canada
 List of Judicial Committee of the Privy Council cases originating in Canada, 1920–29
 List of Supreme Court of Canada cases (Richards Court through Fauteux Court)

References

Further reading
 Robert J. Sharpe & Patricia I. McMahon. The Persons Case: The Origins and Legacy of the Fight for Legal Personhood. Toronto: Osgoode Society for Canadian Legal History, 2007.

External links 

Library and Archives Canada / Bibliothèque et Archives Canada: Famous Five

The Canadian Encyclopedia, The Famous Five

Front Page of Saskatoon Star-Phoenix, October 18, 1929 (from Google News)

Supreme Court of Canada cases
Canadian civil rights case law
Judicial Committee of the Privy Council cases on appeal from Canada
Canadian constitutional case law
1929 in Canadian case law
Women's rights in Canada
Feminism and history
History of women in Canada
Senate of Canada
Supreme Court of Canada reference question cases
Canadian federal government litigation